Seven Screen Studio is an Indian film production and distribution company headed by S. S. Lalit Kumar.

History
S. S. Lalit Kumar set up Chennai-based film production house Seven Screen Studio in 2017, before moving on to producer the Sasikumar-starrer Asuravadham (2018) and distribute 96 (2018) across Tamil Nadu. The film's initial projects were released with the name of Lalit's wife, Leela Lalitkumar.

He subsequently went on to work on higher-profile projects, notably beginning with Lokesh Kanagaraj's Master (2021) featuring Vijay and Vijay Sethupathi in lead roles. The release of the film was delayed multiple times owing to the COVID-19 pandemic, with Lalit Kumar often making announcements that the studio awaits a theatrical release rather than going to a streaming platform.

In 2022, the studio has worked on ventures including Karthik Subbaraj's Mahaan and R. Ajay Gnanamuthu Cobra, both featuring Vikram in the lead. It also produced Vignesh Shivan's Kaathuvaakula Rendu Kaadhal featuring Vijay Sethupathi, Nayanthara and Samantha.

Filmography

As producer

As distributor
96 (2018)
Gorilla (2019)
Master (2021)
Varisu (2023)
Vaathi (2023)
Leo (2023)

References

External links
Official website

Film production companies based in Chennai
2017 establishments in Tamil Nadu
Indian companies established in 2017
Mass media companies established in 2017